The 2010–11 season was Villarreal Club de Fútbol's 88th season in existence and the club's 11th consecutive season in the top flight of Spanish football. In addition to the domestic league, Villarreal participated in this season's editions of the Copa del Rey and the UEFA Europa League. The season covered the period from 1 July 2010 to 30 June 2011.

Players

First-team squad

Out on loan

Pre-season and friendlies

Competitions

Overall record

La Liga

League table

Results summary

Results by round

Matches
The league fixtures were announced on 20 July 2010.

Copa del Rey

Round of 32

Round of 16

Quarter-finals

UEFA Europa League

Play-off round

Group stage

Knockout phase

Round of 32

Round of 16

Quarter-finals

Semi-finals

References

Villarreal CF seasons
Villarreal